The following table compares official EPA ratings for fuel economy (in miles per gallon gasoline equivalent, mpg-e, for plug-in electric vehicles) for series production all-electric passenger vehicles rated by the EPA for model years 2015, 2016, and 2017 versus the model year 2016 vehicles that were rated the most efficient by the EPA with plug-in hybrid drivetrains (Chevrolet Volt second generation), gasoline-electric hybrid drivetrains (Toyota Prius Eco - fourth generation), The average 2016 vehicle gets 25 mpg. and the average new vehicle for that model year, which has a fuel economy of .

EPA rating data are taken from manufacturer testing of their own vehicles, usually conducted using pre-production prototypes. Manufacturers report the results to EPA, which reviews the results and confirms about 15%–20% of them through their own tests at the National Vehicles and Fuel Emissions Laboratory.

 

ADAC also carried out consumption measurements.

See also

References

Electric vehicle industry